National-level elections in Italy are called periodically to form a parliament consisting of two houses: the Chamber of Deputies (Camera dei Deputati) with 400 members; and the Senate of the Republic (Senato della Repubblica) with 200 elected members, plus a few appointed senators for life. Italy is a parliamentary republic: the President of the Republic is elected for a seven-year term by the two houses of Parliament in joint session, together with special electors appointed by the Regional Councils.

The most recent Italian general election was held on 25 September 2022.

2022 election

The last general election was held on 25 September 2022

The centre-right coalition, in which Giorgia Meloni's Brothers of Italy emerged as the main political force, won an absolute majority of seats in the Chamber of Deputies and in the Senate of the Republic. The centre-left coalition, the anti-establishment Five Star Movement and the centrist Action - Italia Viva came in second, third and fourth respectively.

Chamber of Deputies

Senate

Voter turnout

Graph of general election results

This graph shows the results of elections held in Italy from 1946 to today, with the percentages of consensus gathered by the various parties and movements displayed by color. Passing your mouse over the different colored sections will display the name
of the grouping and the percentage in the corresponding election. Clicking on a region will direct you to the article on the party or election selected.
This is, instead, the graph for general elections from 1946 in Italy by absolute numbers of votes for every party:

Referendums

The constitution of Italy provides for two kinds of binding referendums.

A legislative referendum can be called in order to abrogate a law totally or partially, if requested by 500,000 electors or five regional councils. This kind of referendum is valid only if at least a majority of electors goes to the polling station. It is forbidden to call a referendum regarding financial laws or laws relating to pardons or the ratification of international treaties.

A constitutional referendum can be called in order to approve a constitutional law or amendment only when it has been approved by the Houses (Chamber of Deputies and Senate of the Republic) with a majority of less than two thirds in both or either House, and only at the request of one fifth of the members of either House, or 500,000 electors or five Regional Councils. A constitutional referendum is valid no matter how many electors go to the polling station. Any citizen entitled to vote in an election may participate in a referendum.

See also
 Electoral calendar
 Italian electoral law of 2017 for the Parliament of Italy
 Primary elections in Italy

References

External links
Adam Carr's Election Archive
Parties and elections
Ministry of Internal Affairs of Italy - Page on Elections
 NSD: European Election Database - Italy publishes regional level election data
Italy Election Data, European Journal of Political Research-Political Data Yearbook: Interactive

 
General elections in Italy
Articles containing image maps